Santiago Palavecino (born 1974-11-13 in Buenos Aires) is a retired male boxer from Argentina, who won the bronze medal in the men's heavyweight (– 91 kg) category at the 1995 Pan American Games in Mar del Plata. In the semi finals he lost to Cuba's eventual gold medalist Félix Savón. Palavecino made his professional debut on 1999-02-26 defeating Pablo Beckmann on points.

References
 

1974 births
Living people
Boxers from Buenos Aires
Boxers at the 1995 Pan American Games
Pan American Games bronze medalists for Argentina
Argentine male boxers
Pan American Games medalists in boxing
Heavyweight boxers
Medalists at the 1995 Pan American Games